State Highway 31 (SH 31) is a New Zealand state highway in the Waikato region. It provides a link to the harbour town of Kawhia on the west coast of the North Island.

Route description
SH 31/SH 39 initially travels north-west along Kawhia Road. After 14 km and just after the locality of Tihiroa the highway meets a junction where SH 39 carries on north and SH 31 turns sharply west, staying on Kawhia Road. The road from here on is extremely windy and treachourous, having in 2012 been assessed as the state highway with the highest personal risk. SH 31 eventually reaches Pouewe Street in Kawhia where it terminates.

It was classified as a state highway on 1 April 1948.

Major intersections

History 
From about 1900 a coach ran for passengers between Kawhia and Te Awamutu, with a launch between Kawhia and Ōpārau. Ōpārau Ferry Bridge opened in 1913. In 1924 a  concrete bridge was built over the Ōpārau to carry what is now SH 31. Metalling of the road was completed in 1926.

See also
 List of New Zealand state highways

References

External links
 New Zealand Transport Agency

31
Transport in Waikato